Dillstädt is a municipality in the district Schmalkalden-Meiningen, in Thuringia, Germany.

References

Schmalkalden-Meiningen